The 89th Street station was a local station on the demolished IRT Third Avenue Line in Manhattan, New York City. It was originally built on December 9, 1878. The outer tracks were served by local trains and two side platforms. The center track was built as part of the Dual Contracts, it bypassed the station and served express trains. 89th Street station was the terminus of the IRT Third Avenue Line until it was expanded to 129th Street on December 30, 1878. This station closed on May 12, 1955, with the ending of all service on the Third Avenue El south of 149th Street. North of the station were connecting tracks to the 98th Street Yard.

References

External links
 
 

IRT Third Avenue Line stations
Railway stations in the United States opened in 1878
Railway stations closed in 1955
Former elevated and subway stations in Manhattan
1878 establishments in New York (state)
1955 disestablishments in New York (state)
Third Avenue